Aaron Swayzee House, also known as the Swayzee-Love House, is a historic home located at Marion, Grant County, Indiana.  It was built in 1855, and is a two-story, "L"-shaped, Greek Revival style brick dwelling painted white. The front facade features a pedimented portico with two 22-foot tall Corinthian order columns and stained glass windows.  It is one of the oldest houses in Marion and Grant County.

It was listed on the National Register of Historic Places in 1983.

References

Marion, Indiana
Houses on the National Register of Historic Places in Indiana
Greek Revival houses in Indiana
Houses completed in 1855
Buildings and structures in Grant County, Indiana
National Register of Historic Places in Grant County, Indiana